In Christianity, the doctrine of the Trinity states that God is a single essence who exists, consubstantiality and co-eternally, as a perichoresis of three distinct hypostases ("persons"): the Father, the Son, and the Holy Spirit. Islam considers the concept of any "plurality" within God to be a denial of monotheism and foreign to the revelation found in Muslim scripture. Shirk, the act of ascribing partners to God – whether they be sons, daughters, or other partners – is considered to be a form of unbelief in Islam. The Quran repeatedly and firmly asserts God's absolute oneness, thus ruling out the possibility of another being sharing his sovereignty or nature. In Islam, the Holy Spirit is believed to be the Angel Gabriel. Muslims have explicitly rejected Christian doctrines of the Trinity from an early date.

In the Quran

Furthermore, verses 19:88-93, 23:91, and 112:1-4 are relevant to the doctrine of "Trinity":

Discussion

Interpretation of these verses by modern scholars has been varied. Although the latter group of verses have usually been taken to reject the mainstream Christian view of Jesus as son of God, Watt has argued that they refer specifically to an unorthodox notion of "physical sonship".:47

Verse 5:73 has been interpreted as a potential criticism of Syriac literature that references Jesus as "the third of three" and thus an attack on the view that Christ was divine. Hence, verses 5:72–75 may merely be criticizing the idea that Jesus and God are the same. Alternatively, it may be a purposeful simplification of the Christian belief in the humanity and divinity of Christ in order to expose its potential weakness when viewed from the firmly monotheistic position of Islam.:47

Similarly, verse 4:171 can be read as a rejection of Jesus' divinity. It is worth noting that in explaining these verses, early Muslim Quranic commentators noted that "the Christian 'three' was an internal characteristic of the godhead... rather than a series of external beings placed together with God."

Some Muslim commentators believe  as referring to Mary as part of the Christian Trinity. Critics use this to argue that the Quran's author was mistaken about orthodox Christian beliefs, wherein Mary is a human and the third part of the Trinity is the Holy Spirit.

On the other hand, Muslims argue that past heretical Christians have explicitly believed Mary to be a divine being. Although some historians, such as Averil Cameron have been  skeptical about whether Collyridians even existed and noted that Epiphanius is the only source for the group and that later authors simply refer to his text. There is no further proof that such a sect ever existed and it is very unlikely that they existed in the 7th century. Others argue that Q5:116 in fact does not allude to the Trinity since the term itself isn't stated in the verse and instances where the Trinity is explicitly mentioned (Q and Q), Mary's alleged divine status is not noted. Some recent Western scholarship support a rhetorical understanding of the Quranic accusation of Mary's divinity claim in Q5:116;:47 arguing the verse generally gives an example of Shirk and admonishes it.

See also

Notes

References

External links
 Dozens of Qur'an translations
 Use of We in Quran and Is Jesus Son of God

Nontrinitarianism
Christianity and Islam
Islam-related controversies
Nature of Jesus Christ